The Kalininsky constituency (No.3) was a Russian legislative constituency in Bashkortostan. The constituency covered Ufa and its suburbs, however, it was expanded to northeastern Bashkiria. The constituency has no successor, as it was partitioned between Ufa, Beloretsk and Neftekamsk constituencies.

Members elected

Election results

1993

|-
! colspan=2 style="background-color:#E9E9E9;text-align:left;vertical-align:top;" |Candidate
! style="background-color:#E9E9E9;text-align:left;vertical-align:top;" |Party
! style="background-color:#E9E9E9;text-align:right;" |Votes
! style="background-color:#E9E9E9;text-align:right;" |%
|-
|style="background-color:#019CDC"|
|align=left|Aleksandr Arinin
|align=left|Party of Russian Unity and Accord
|
|28.94%
|-
|style="background-color:"|
|align=left|Viktor Rezyapov
|align=left|Independent
| -
|21.01%
|-
| colspan="5" style="background-color:#E9E9E9;"|
|- style="font-weight:bold"
| colspan="3" style="text-align:left;" | Total
| 
| 100%
|-
| colspan="5" style="background-color:#E9E9E9;"|
|- style="font-weight:bold"
| colspan="4" |Source:
|
|}

1995

|-
! colspan=2 style="background-color:#E9E9E9;text-align:left;vertical-align:top;" |Candidate
! style="background-color:#E9E9E9;text-align:left;vertical-align:top;" |Party
! style="background-color:#E9E9E9;text-align:right;" |Votes
! style="background-color:#E9E9E9;text-align:right;" |%
|-
|style="background-color:"|
|align=left|Aleksandr Arinin (incumbent)
|align=left|Independent
|
|24.83%
|-
|style="background-color:"|
|align=left|Viktor Rezyapov
|align=left|Independent
|
|13.02%
|-
|style="background-color:"|
|align=left|Vladimir Petoshin
|align=left|Communist Party
|
|10.73%
|-
|style="background-color:"|
|align=left|Viktor Drozdenko
|align=left|Power to the People
|
|10.28%
|-
|style="background-color:"|
|align=left|Raikhana Gilmanova
|align=left|Education — Future of Russia
|
|9.65%
|-
|style="background-color:#D50000"|
|align=left|Aleksandr Sergeyev
|align=left|Communists and Working Russia - for the Soviet Union
|
|6.98%
|-
|style="background-color:"|
|align=left|Yelena Makhmutova
|align=left|Independent
|
|5.20%
|-
|style="background-color:"|
|align=left|Nikolay Astafyev
|align=left|Liberal Democratic Party
|
|2.91%
|-
|style="background-color:#DD137B"|
|align=left|Sergey Shikhovtsev
|align=left|Social Democrats
|
|1.12%
|-
|style="background-color:#000000"|
|colspan=2 |against all
|
|12.80%
|-
| colspan="5" style="background-color:#E9E9E9;"|
|- style="font-weight:bold"
| colspan="3" style="text-align:left;" | Total
| 
| 100%
|-
| colspan="5" style="background-color:#E9E9E9;"|
|- style="font-weight:bold"
| colspan="4" |Source:
|
|}

1999

|-
! colspan=2 style="background-color:#E9E9E9;text-align:left;vertical-align:top;" |Candidate
! style="background-color:#E9E9E9;text-align:left;vertical-align:top;" |Party
! style="background-color:#E9E9E9;text-align:right;" |Votes
! style="background-color:#E9E9E9;text-align:right;" |%
|-
|style="background-color:"|
|align=left|Vladimir Pevtsov
|align=left|Our Home – Russia
|
|18.45%
|-
|style="background-color:"|
|align=left|Makhmut Bikbulatov
|align=left|Independent
|
|16.99%
|-
|style="background-color:"|
|align=left|Mikhail Zaytsev
|align=left|Independent
|
|13.04%
|-
|style="background-color:"|
|align=left|Vladimir Petoshin
|align=left|Communist Party
|
|9.52%
|-
|style="background-color:"|
|align=left|Rafis Kadyrov
|align=left|Independent
|
|6.75%
|-
|style="background-color:#D50000"|
|align=left|Aleksandr Sergeyev
|align=left|Communists and Workers of Russia - for the Soviet Union
|
|4.60%
|-
|style="background-color:"|
|align=left|Rafika Amineva
|align=left|Russian All-People's Union
|
|4.00%
|-
|style="background-color:"|
|align=left|Viktor Drozdenko
|align=left|Independent
|
|3.99%
|-
|style="background-color:"|
|align=left|Albert Slobodchikov
|align=left|Independent
|
|2.92%
|-
|style="background-color:#004BBC"|
|align=left|Azat Idiatullin
|align=left|Russian Cause
|
|2.11%
|-
|style="background-color:#084284"|
|align=left|Nailya Zhiganshina
|align=left|Spiritual Heritage
|
|0.72%
|-
|style="background-color:#000000"|
|colspan=2 |against all
|
|14.57%
|-
| colspan="5" style="background-color:#E9E9E9;"|
|- style="font-weight:bold"
| colspan="3" style="text-align:left;" | Total
| 
| 100%
|-
| colspan="5" style="background-color:#E9E9E9;"|
|- style="font-weight:bold"
| colspan="4" |Source:
|
|}

2003

|-
! colspan=2 style="background-color:#E9E9E9;text-align:left;vertical-align:top;" |Candidate
! style="background-color:#E9E9E9;text-align:left;vertical-align:top;" |Party
! style="background-color:#E9E9E9;text-align:right;" |Votes
! style="background-color:#E9E9E9;text-align:right;" |%
|-
|style="background-color:"|
|align=left|Franis Saifullin
|align=left|United Russia
|
|41.57%
|-
|style="background-color:#FFD700"|
|align=left|Vladimir Pevtsov (incumbent)
|align=left|People's Party
|
|12.98%
|-
|style="background-color:"|
|align=left|Ramil Mirsayev
|align=left|Independent
|
|9.94%
|-
|style="background-color:"|
|align=left|Vladimir Petoshin
|align=left|Communist Party
|
|6.29%
|-
|style="background-color:"|
|align=left|Khasan Idiyatullin
|align=left|Independent
|
|4.96%
|-
|style="background-color:"|
|align=left|Igor Naumov
|align=left|Liberal Democratic Party
|
|3.63%
|-
|style="background-color:#1042A5"|
|align=left|Vyacheslav Gilyazitdinov
|align=left|Union of Right Forces
|
|1.99%
|-
|style="background-color:"|
|align=left|Sergey Doynikov
|align=left|Independent
|
|1.96%
|-
|style="background-color:#164C8C"|
|align=left|Pavel Chugunov
|align=left|United Russian Party Rus'
|
|1.28%
|-
|style="background-color:"|
|align=left|Vladimir Putenikhin
|align=left|Independent
|
|1.17%
|-
|style="background-color:"|
|align=left|Rinat Khazeyev
|align=left|Independent
|
|1.13%
|-
|style="background-color:#000000"|
|colspan=2 |against all
|
|8.42%
|-
| colspan="5" style="background-color:#E9E9E9;"|
|- style="font-weight:bold"
| colspan="3" style="text-align:left;" | Total
| 
| 100%
|-
| colspan="5" style="background-color:#E9E9E9;"|
|- style="font-weight:bold"
| colspan="4" |Source:
|
|}

Notes

References 

Obsolete Russian legislative constituencies
Politics of Bashkortostan